The Don B. Huntley College of Agriculture is the college of agriculture at California State Polytechnic University, Pomona (Cal Poly Pomona) located in Pomona, California, United States. Founded in 1938, the college offers instruction in eight majors leading to the bachelor of science degree. Over  of university-owned land are available for pastures, crops, groves and ornamental plantings.

Admissions

Facilities

The vast number of buildings comprising the college of Agriculture are located throughout campus. Building 2 houses the majority of classrooms, laboratories and faculty offices, as well as in Building 45 and the College of Environmental Design – Building 7.

Production units which include a citrus packing house and meat science processing laboratory
Farm Store and landscape nursery
 of green houses and shade houses
 devoted to pastures, crops, groves and ornamental plantings
Livestock units that house cattle, swine and sheep
Pine Tree Ranch, a  citrus and avocado ranch in Santa Paula, Ventura Country
W. K. Kellogg Arabian Horse Center, a modern horse breeding, training and showing facility
Apparel Technology and Research Center, a research center which provides outreach education and resource information service to the apparel and sewn products industry
Center for Turf, Irrigation, and Landscape Technology (CTILT), focused on landscape and irrigation research and development
The Center for Antimicrobial Research and Food Safety, which addresses foodborne pathogens
The Westwind Ranch,  located in the city of Chino, a center for forage and grain production for livestock and dairy industry
The Spadra Ranch, devoted to vegetable and fruit production as well as a home to student and faculty research projects
Agriscapes, directly across the street from the main campus, is a showcase facility featuring classrooms, a visitor center, a farm store and a new ornamental horticulture unit. Over  of greenhouse supports research and production of edible and ornamental plants, the Raymond Burr Orchid Collection, Weeks Roses research and rose breeding facilities, hydroponic production and plans for a future conservatory.
A Model Agriculture Education Classroom is housed in building 2 for application-based hands on learning dedicated to developing the skills of students preparing to enter agricultural education professions.

References

External links
 

California State Polytechnic University, Pomona
Agriculture in California
Educational institutions established in 1939
1939 establishments in California